Otis Hughley Jr. (born September 25, 1964) is an American basketball coach and is the current head coach of the Alabama A&M Bulldogs men's basketball team. He previously served as the head coach of the Nigerian national team, where he guided the team to three AfroBasket Women championships and the 2020 Summer Olympics.

Coaching career
Hughley began coaching at Wallace Community College Selma in 1993, where he was the coach of both the men's and women's basketball teams. In that time, he'd guide the men to a 90–25 record including two conference championships, and the women to a 45–21 mark, with a number four national ranking. In 1997, Hughley would join the men's basketball staff at Wright State under Ed Schilling for a single season before spending a season as an assistant coach at Liberty. He'd spend an additional year in college coaching with Southern under Ben Jobe from 2001 to 2002, before embarking on a career in professional basketball coaching overseas where he'd be an assistant coach with the Shandong Bulls of the Chinese Basketball Association.

In 2004, Hughley would return stateside to coach the boys basketball team at LeFlore Magnet High School in Mobile, Alabama. During that time, he'd lead the team to a 185–20, while also coaching future NBA player DeMarcus Cousins. In 2010, Hughley would follow Cousins to the NBA as he became an assistant coach with the Sacramento Kings for the 2010–11 NBA season. After that lone year with the Kings, Hughley joined the Golden State Warriors in its development and video coaching department, before returning to be a scout for the Kings from 2012 to 2016.

Once again, Hughley would head abroad; in 2015, he would coach both the men and women's national teams of Chinese Taipei, while also serving as an assistant coach with the Tianjin Gold Lions in China. In 2017, Hughley would be named the head coach of the Nigeria women's national basketball team. While with D'Tigress, he'd help guide them to three AfroBasket Women's titles in 2017, 2019, and 2021, as well as an appearance in the 2020 Olympic Games. Nigeria, along with Senegal also became the first African women's teams to win a game in the 2018 FIBA Women's Basketball World Cup, while finishing in eighth, which is the highest finish for an African side in the event.

On April 18, 2022, Hughley was named the men's basketball coach at Alabama A&M, replacing Dylan Howard.

Head coaching record

College

NCAA D1

References

Living people
American expatriate sportspeople in Nigeria
American men's basketball coaches
Nigerian Olympic coaches
American expatriate basketball people in Taiwan
Wright State Raiders men's basketball coaches
Alabama A&M Bulldogs basketball coaches
Liberty Flames basketball coaches
Southern Jaguars basketball coaches
Sacramento Kings assistant coaches
1964 births